Miguel Palau (18 June 1901 – 9 March 1987) was a Spanish long-distance runner. He competed in the men's 5000 metres at the 1924 Summer Olympics.

References

External links
 

1901 births
1987 deaths
Athletes (track and field) at the 1924 Summer Olympics
Spanish male long-distance runners
Olympic athletes of Spain
Place of birth missing
Olympic cross country runners